John Drysdale may refer to:
 John Drysdale (politician) (born 1926), member of the House of Commons of Canada
 John Drysdale (cricketer) (1862–1923), Australian cricketer
 John Drysdale (footballer) (born 1913), Scottish footballer 
 John Drysdale (moderator) (1718–1788), twice Moderator of the General Assembly of the Church of Scotland
 John Drysdale (historian) (1925–2016), British-born army officer, diplomat and historian